Empress Jin (靳皇后/金皇后) may refer to one of the following Chinese empresses:

 Jin Yueguang (靳月光) and Jin Yuehua (靳月華), two of Han Zhao emperor Liu Cong's later empresses.
 Empress Jin (Yin), empress of Han Zhao emperor Liu Can.
 Empress Jin Feishan, empress of Former Shu emperor Wang Yan.
 Lady Jin, wife of Min emperor Wang Yanjun, sometimes referred to as Empress Jin.

Jin